The Fairburn Historic Commercial District is a historic district in Fairburn, South Dakota which was listed on the National Register of Historic Places in 1995.  The listing then included five contributing buildings. It was decreased in size in 2018.

On the east side of Main Street, it includes two two-story false-front buildings, the IOOF Hall and Smith's Store.  On the west side is a two-story gable-roofed building, the Warren-Lamb Hotel.  These three buildings were built between 1917 and 1918.

References

National Register of Historic Places in Custer County, South Dakota
Historic districts on the National Register of Historic Places in South Dakota

Buildings and structures completed in 1917
Hotels in South Dakota
Clubhouses on the National Register of Historic Places
Odd Fellows buildings in South Dakota